"La Rivière de notre enfance" is the name of a 2004 song recorded in duet by the Canadian singer Garou and the French artist Michel Sardou. It was released in November 2004 as the third single from Garou's second studio album, Reviens, on which it features as 17th track, and the first single from Sardou's album, Du Plaisir (fourth track). The song was a number one hit in France and Belgium (Wallonia) and also achieved success in Switzerland. It was the fourth #1 hit in France for Garou, allowing him to be the artist who totals the most weeks at #1 in this country.

As of August 2014, it is the 38th best-selling single of the 21st century in France, with 462,500 units sold.

It features on many French compilations, such as Duos and the charity album Solidarité Asie, featuring on it as the first track.

The song was written by the famous composer and songwriter Didier Barbelivien, who also wrote composed several hits for various artists such as Elsa Lunghini, Patricia Kaas, Johnny Hallyday, Caroline Legrand and Corynne Charby.

Track listings
CD single
"La Rivière de notre enfance" — 3:24
"L'Aveu" (live) by Garou — 4:43
"La Rivière de notre enfance" (instrumental version) — 3:24

Digital download
"La Rivière de notre enfance" — 3:24

Charts and certifications

Peak positions

Year-end charts

Certifications

References

External links
"La Rivière de notre enfance", lyrics + music video

2004 singles
Garou (singer) songs
Michel Sardou songs
Columbia Records singles
Songs written by Didier Barbelivien
Songs written by Michel Sardou
Ultratop 50 Singles (Wallonia) number-one singles
SNEP Top Singles number-one singles
Male vocal duets
2003 songs